Bellator 262: Velasquez vs. Kielholtz was a mixed martial arts event produced by Bellator MMA that took place on July 16, 2021 at Mohegan Sun Arena in Uncasville, Connecticut.

Background 
Undefeated Juliana Velasquez made her first title defense of the Bellator MMA Women's Flyweight World Championship against top-tier kickboxer Denise Kielholtz. The Brazil native has won all six of her fights in Bellator, including three by finish. Velasquez, 34, has a background in judo. Ranked #4 Kielholtz (6-2) is the Bellator Kickboxing Women's Flyweight Championship and has won four straight in MMA. She is 6-1 under the Bellator MMA banner.

Two heavyweight bouts were announced for the main card: the #5 ranked Tyrell Fortune faced the #7 ranked Matt Mitrione, while the #4 ranked Linton Vassell was expected to meet the promotional newcomer Marcelo Golm. On July 12, the bout between Vassell and Golm was scratched after Vassell suffered an injury.

Former Bellator Women's Featherweight title challenger Arlene Blencowe fought Dayana Silva on the main card.

Travis Davis faced the undefeated Johnny Eblen in a middleweight bout, which served as the main card opener.

A heavyweight bout between Ronny Markes and Said Sowma took place on the preliminary portion of the event.

A welterweight bout between the undefeated Roman Faraldo and promotional newcomer John Ramirez was announced for the event prelims. However, Faraldo had to pull out off the bout after his wife went into labor.

Results

See also 

 2021 in Bellator MMA
 List of Bellator MMA events
 List of current Bellator fighters
 Bellator MMA Rankings

References 

Bellator MMA events
Events in Uncasville, Connecticut
2021 in mixed martial arts
July 2021 sports events in the United States
2021 in sports in Connecticut
Mixed martial arts in Connecticut
Sports competitions in Connecticut